Triphenylmethanethiol is an organosulfur compound with the formula (C6H5)3CSH.  It is the thiol derivative of the bulky substituent triphenylmethyl (called trityl).

The compound forms a number of unusual derivatives that are more stable than less bulky analogues.  The sulfenyl chloride (C6H5)3CSCl is obtained from the thiol with sulfuryl chloride.  It in turn reacts with ammonia to form the sulfenamide (C6H5)3CSNH2.  The thiol reacts with nitrous acid to give  S-nitrosotriphenylmethanethiol (C6H5)3CSNO.

References

Thiols
Phenyl compounds